"Der Doppelgänger" is one of the six songs from Franz Schubert's Schwanengesang that sets words by Heinrich Heine for piano and tenor voice. It was written in 1828, the year of Schubert's death.

Text 

The title "Der Doppelgänger" is Schubert's; in Heine's  (1827) the poem is untitled, making the ending a surprise. Heine used the spelling "Doppeltgänger".

Still ist die Nacht, es ruhen die Gassen,
In diesem Hause wohnte mein Schatz;
Sie hat schon längst die Stadt verlassen,
Doch steht noch das Haus auf demselben Platz.

Da steht auch ein Mensch und starrt in die Höhe,
Und ringt die Hände, vor Schmerzensgewalt;
Mir graust es, wenn ich sein Antlitz sehe, -
Der Mond zeigt mir meine eigne Gestalt.

Du Doppelgänger! du bleicher Geselle!
Was äffst du nach mein Liebesleid,
Das mich gequält auf dieser Stelle,
So manche Nacht, in alter Zeit?
The night is quiet, the streets are calm,
In this house my beloved once lived:
A long time ago she left the town,
But the house still stands, here in the same place.

A man stands there also and looks to the sky,
And wrings his hands, overwhelmed by pain:
I am terrified – when I see his face, 
The moon shows me my own form!

O you Doppelgänger! you pale comrade!
Why do you ape the pain of my love
Which tormented me upon this spot
So many a night, so long ago?

Context 

Heine's Buch der Lieder is divided into five sections; all the poems set in Schwanengesang are from the third, Die Heimkehr (The Homecoming). In Schwanengesang, this song stands at the end of the Heine songs, although Heine's order is different and it has been argued that the sequence works better dramatically when the songs are performed in their order of appearance in the Buch der Lieder.

This song's context requires some background in the Doppelg%C3%A4nger mythology to parse. Seeing one's own Doppelgänger in this mythology implies that you are dead, so the middle of the piece reaches a peak as the singer realizes that the stranger is their Doppelgänger. Immediately afterwards the piece becomes very quiet as the singer internally comes to terms with the reality that they did not, in fact, return from the war.

Music 

"Der Doppelgänger" is through-composed; each stanza's setting is different, but not altogether different: the song is a kind of passacaglia on the theme of the first four bars of the piano part. This ambiguous harmonic progression is made of chords that lack one note, leaving it unclear what the harmony is. The first chord lacks a third, so could be B major or B minor. The second has only the interval of a third, so it is unclear whether it is the first inversion of a D-sharp minor chord or the second inversion of F-sharp major. This ambiguity is only resolved with the entry of the voice, when the harmony of B minor with its dominant, F-sharp major, is established.

The piano part, consisting almost entirely of block chords that gradually become denser, dominates the song and does much to give it its feeling of inexorability, and its brief abandonment (displaced by a succession of increasingly dissonant chords) at the climax of the song signals the frantic horror of the poet. At this point, the initially ambiguous harmony returns with a modulation to D-sharp minor on the words Was äffst du nach mein Liebesleid (bar 47).

The song is 63 bars long, and in a typical performance lasts between 4 and 5 minutes. It is in the key of B minor, the same as Schubert's Unfinished Symphony.

References

External links
 , Dietrich Fischer-Dieskau, Gerald Moore (Franz Schubert – The Song Cycles, Deutsche Grammophon)

Lieder composed by Franz Schubert
Musical settings of poems by Heinrich Heine
Compositions in B minor
1828 compositions